Santa Colomba is a village in Tuscany, central Italy, administratively a frazione of the comune of Monteriggioni, province of Siena. At the time of the 2001 census its population was 32.

Santa Colomba is about 14 km from Siena and 12 km from Monteriggioni.

Main sights 
 Santi Pietro e Paolo (12th century), main parish church of the village
 Villa Santa Colomba
 Hermitage of San Giovanni al Lago

References 

Frazioni of Monteriggioni